Mycobilimbia is a genus of lichens in the family Lecideaceae.

Species
Mycobilimbia austrocalifornica 
Mycobilimbia meridionalis 
Mycobilimbia olivacea 
Mycobilimbia parvilobulosa 
Mycobilimbia ramea 
Mycobilimbia subbyssoidea 
Mycobilimbia territorialis  – Australia
Mycobilimbia violascens

References

Lecanoromycetes genera
Lichen genera
Taxa described in 1890
Taxa named by Heinrich Rehm